Lanton is an unincorporated community in southern Howell County, Missouri, United States. It is located on Missouri Route 17 between Missouri Route 142 and the Arkansas line approximately one mile to the south.

A post office called Lanton was established in 1881, and remained in operation until 1977. The community's name is an amalgamation of Lancaster and Sutton, the surnames of two early settlers.

The former Lanton school is located next to the Fire Station, and is in extreme disrepair.

The Lanton Fire Department boasts the lowest ISO rating in the region of most rural fire departments, and operates out of two stations, one in Lanton proper, the other halfway to West Plains.

Lanton presently has a church, three convenience/package stores, White Ranch State Forest, Vanderhoef State Forest, Love Hole, and not much more. Renowned region wide for its deer hunting, during October and November there are many hunters in the area from other parts of the state.

References

Unincorporated communities in Howell County, Missouri
Unincorporated communities in Missouri